Alain Mottet (30 December 1928 in Lyon, France – 31 October 2017 in Paris, France) was a French actor.

Biography 
Alain Mottet appeared in dozens of films, often in secondary roles. He appeared in three films with José Giovanni. In 1965, he played the main role in L'Affaire de la malle à Gouffé. In 1969, in L'Armée des ombres, he was responsible for the prison camp where Lino Ventura, alias Philippe Gerbier, was imprisoned. 

For television, he played Flambart, the police officer who chased Eugène François Vidocq relentlessly, played by Bernard Noël in the TV series Vidocq in 1967. He regularly worked with director Abder Isker including on several episodes of Au théâtre ce soir. One of his most notable TV roles was as Shazénian in the fairytale Shéhérazade, shown at the end of 1971: on a flying horse, he walks with Claude Jade into the night sky. 

In parallel to his screen career, he also continued to work on stage, most notably in plays by Jean Le Poulain, Roger Planchon, André Barsacq and Georges Wilson. He was part of the cast of the Comédie-Française from 1986 to 1988.

Private life 
Married to Françoise Hirsch (1930-2017), until his death on 31 October 2017, he is the father of Christine Mottet and actor and musician Pierre Mottet.

Theatre 
 1950 : Bottines et collets montés by Eugène Labiche and Georges Courteline, directed by Roger Planchon, théâtre de la Comédie de Lyon
 1950 : Faust Hamlet by Thomas Kyd and Christopher Marlowe, directed by Roger Planchon, théâtre de la Comédie de Lyon
 1951 : Twelfth Night by William Shakespeare, directed by Roger Planchon, théâtre de la Comédie de Lyon
 1952 : The Merry Wives of Windsor by William Shakespeare, directed by Roger Planchon, théâtre de la Comédie de Lyon
 1952 : Life Is a Dream by Pedro Calderón de la Barca, directed by Roger Planchon, théâtre de la Comédie de Lyon
 1952 : Claire by René Char, directed by Roger Planchon, théâtre de la Comédie de Lyon
 1953 : La Découverte du nouveau monde by Felix Lope de Vega, directed by Hubert Gignoux, Théâtre National de Bretagne
 1953 : L'Archipel Lenoir by Armand Salacrou, directed by Hubert Gignoux, Théâtre National de Bretagne
 1953 : Knock ou le Triomphe de la médecine by Jules Romains, directed by Hubert Gignoux, Théâtre National de Bretagne
 1954 : Le Voyageur sans bagage by Jean Anouilh, directed by Hubert Gignoux, Théâtre National de Bretagne
 1954 : Le Marchand de Venise by William Shakespeare, directed by Hubert Gignoux, Théâtre National de Bretagne
 1955 : The Merry Wives of Windsor by William Shakespeare, directed by André Steigner, festival de Bellac
 1955 : La Mort joyeuse by Nikolai Evreinov, directed by André Steigner, festival de Bellac
 1955 : Mariana Pineda by Federico García Lorca, directed by André Steigner, festival de Bellac
 1956 : L'Impromptu de l'Alma by Eugène Ionesco, directed by Maurice Jacquemont, Théâtre des Champs-Élysées
 1956 : Les Chaises by Eugène Ionesco, directed by Jacques Mauclair, Théâtre des Champs-Élysées, théâtre des Célestins
 1957 : Les Coréens by Michel Vinaver, directed by Jean-Marie Serreau, Alliance Française
 1957-1958 : Paolo Paoli by Arthur Adamov, directed by Roger Planchon, théâtre de la Comédie de Lyon and théâtre du Vieux-Colombier
 1958 : Procès à Jésus by Diego Fabbri, directed by Marcelle Tassencourt, théâtre Hébertot
 1959 : Les Possédés by Albert Camus after Fiodor Dostoïevski, directed by Albert Camus, théâtre Antoine
 1960 : Dead Souls by Nikolai Gogol, directed by Roger Planchon, Théâtre de la Cité de Villeurbanne, Odéon-Théâtre de l'Europe
 1960 : Les Chaises by Eugène Ionesco, directed by Jacques Mauclair, Théâtre des Champs-Élysées
 1960 : Christobal de Lugo by Loys Masson, directed by Bernard Jenny, théâtre du Vieux-Colombier
 1960 : Le Signe du feu by Diego Fabbri, directed by Marcelle Tassencourt, théâtre Hébertot
 1961 : Twelfth Night by William Shakespeare, directed by Jean Le Poulain, théâtre du Vieux-Colombier
 1961-1962 : Le Christ recrucifié by Nikos Kazantzakis, directed by Marcelle Tassencourt, théâtre Montansier and Odéon-Théâtre de l'Europe
 1962-1963 : Victor ou les Enfants au pouvoir by Roger Vitrac, directed by Jean Anouilh and Roland Piétri, théâtre de l'Ambigu and théâtre de l'Athénée
 1963 : Andromaque by Racine, directed by Marcelle Tassencourt, théâtre Montparnasse
 1963 : Le Vicaire by Rolf Hochhuth, directed by François Darbon, théâtre de l'Athénée 
 1965 : Ce soir on improvise by Luigi Pirandello, directed by André Barsacq, théâtre de l'Atelier
 1966 : La Promenade du dimanche by Georges Michel, directed by Maurice Jacquemont, Georges Michel, studio des Champs-Élysées
 1967 : Le Duel by Anton Tchekov, directed by André Barsacq, théâtre de l'Atelier
 1967 : Opéra pour un tyran by Henri-François Rey, directed by André Barsacq, théâtre de l'Atelier
 1967 : Le Triomphe de la sensibilité by Goethe, directed by Jorge Lavelli, festival d'Avignon
 1968 : The Mother by Bertolt Brecht, directed by Jacques Rosner, TNP Théâtre national de Chaillot 
 1969 : Jules César by William Shakespeare, directed by Jean Deschamps, festival de la Cité (Carcassonne)
 1968 : The Devil and the Good Lord by Jean-Paul Sartre, directed by Georges Wilson, TNP Théâtre national de Chaillot
 1969 : Le Bossu by Paul Féval, directed by Jean Deschamps, festival de la Cité (Carcassonne)
 1970 : The Devil and the Good Lord by Jean-Paul Sartre, directed by Georges Wilson, TNP festival d'Avignon
 1970 : Opérette by Witold Gombrowicz, directed by Jacques Rosner, TNP Théâtre national de Chaillot
 1971 : Henri VIII by William Shakespeare, directed by Gabriel Garran, théâtre de la Commune 
 1972 : Macbett by Eugène Ionesco, directed by Jacques Mauclair, Alliance Française 
 1972 : Honni soit qui mal y pense by Peter Barnes, directed by Stuart Burge, théâtre de Paris 
 1973-1974 : Madame Sans-Gêne by Victorien Sardou and Émile Moreau, directed by Michel Roux, théâtre de Paris and théâtre Marigny : Joseph Fouché
 1974 : Croque-monsieur by Marcel Mithois, directed by Jean-Pierre Grenier, théâtre Saint-Georges
 1974 : Le Siècle des lumières by Claude Brulé, directed by Jean-Laurent Cochet, théâtre du Palais Royal 
 1976 : Lucienne et le Boucher by Marcel Aymé, directed by Nicole Anouilh, théâtre Saint-Georges
 1978 : Miam-miam ou le Dîner d'affaires by Jacques Deval, directed by Jean Le Poulain, théâtre Marigny
 1980 : Une drôle de vie by Brian Clark, directed by Michel Fagadau, Théâtre Antoine
 1981 : Outrages aux bonnes mœurs by Eric Westphal, directed by Jean-Louis Martin Barbaz, théâtre Hébertot
 1981 : Petit déjeuner chez Desdémone by Janusz Krasinski, directed by Jaroslav Vizner, Carré Silvia-Monfort
 1984 : Le Passeport by Pierre Bourgeade, directed by Bruno Carlucci, théâtre de l'Athénée-Louis-Jouvet 
 1987 : Polyeucte by Corneille, directed by Jorge Lavelli, Comédie-Française
 1987 : Esther by Racine, directed by Françoise Seigner, Comédie-Française at the Odéon-Théâtre de l'Europe, and théâtre de la Porte-Saint-Martin
 1987 : Une sorte d'Alaska by Harold Pinter, directed by Bernard Murat, Comédie-Française at the Festival d'Avignon, and théâtre Montparnasse
 1988 : Le Véritable Saint-Genest, comédien et martyr by Jean de Rotrou, directed by André Steiger, Comédie-Française
 1988 : À ta santé, Dorothée by Rémo Forlani, directed by Jacques Seiler, théâtre de la Renaissance
 1989 : Point de feu sans fumée by Julien Vartet, directed by Jean-Paul Tribout, théâtre Édouard VII
 1990 : La Dame de chez Maxim by Georges Feydeau, directed by Alain Françon, théâtre du Huitième-Lyon
 1998 : Alfred aime O'Keeffe by Lanie Robertson, directed by Georges Werler, théâtre Silvia-Monfort
 2007 : Chemin du ciel (Himmelweg) by Juan Mayorga, directed by Jorge Lavelli, théâtre de la Tempête

Filmography

Cinema 
1962: Climats (by Stellio Lorenzi)
1962: Le Pèlerin perdu (Short, by Guy Jorré) - Le pèlerin
1963: Le Feu follet (by Louis Malle) - Urcel
1967: Le Dimanche de la vie (by Jean Herman)
1968: Ho! (by Robert Enrico) - Paul
1969: L'Armée des ombres (by Jean-Pierre Melville) - Commander of the camp
1969: Une veuve en or (by Michel Audiard) - Le notaire (uncredited)
1969: Dernier domicile connu (by José Giovanni) - Frank Lambert
1970: Un aller simple (by José Giovanni) - Nitesse
1972: La Scoumoune (by José Giovanni) - Ficelle
1973: Le viol (by Jean Dasque)
1976: The Good and the Bad (by Claude Lelouch) - Le commissaire Blanchot
1977: La Nuit de Saint-Germain-des-Prés (by Bob Swaim) - Marc Ovet
1978: L'Amour en question (by André Cayatte) - L'avocat général
1978: Le Point douloureux (by Marc Bourgeois) - Le directeur
1980: Inspecteur la Bavure (by Claude Zidi) - Dumeze - le directeur de la police
1982: Un dimanche de flic (by Michel Vianey) - Director
1990: My New Partner II (by Claude Zidi) - Le préfet
2001: Aram (by Robert Kechichian) - Miran Sarkissian

Television 

1962: Paludi (by Diego Fabbri) (telefilm by Gilbert Pineau) - Alf
1964: Les Indes noires (by Marcel Bluwal) - James Starr
1965: Belphégor ou le Fantôme du Louvre (TV show by Claude Barma)
1965: Donadieu (by Stellio Lorenzi) - Berthelien
1966: L'Écharpe (telefilm by Abder Isker) - Édouard Tranier 
1966: Les Compagnons de Jéhu (miniseries) - Toussaint
1967: L'Affaire Lourdes (by Marcel Bluwal)
1967: Vidocq (13 episodes) - Flambart
1970: À corps perdu (telefilm by Abder Isker) - Victor Colonna
1971: Shéhérazade (telefilm by Pierre Badel) - Shazénian
1971: Les Salauds vont en enfer (telefilm by Abder Isker) - Hal
1972: La Mort d'un champion telefilm by Abder Isker : Denis Clément
1972: Les Six Hommes en question (by Abder Isker)
1972: Les Misérables (by Marcel Bluwal) - Thénardier
1973: Les Coqs de minuit (miniseries, FR3) (by Édouard Logereau) - Maître Régis
1974: La Passagère by Abder Isker : le commissaire Clément
1974: Les Cinq Dernières Minutes (by Claude Loursais, Episode: "Fausses Notes") - Igor Cléry
1974: Au théâtre ce soir (Madame Sans-Gêne) (by Victorien Sardou and Émile Moreau, director Michel Roux, Georges Folgoas, théâtre Marigny : Joseph Fouché)
1974: La Main enchantée (by Michel Subiela) - maître Chevassut
1975: Les Grands Détectives (by Jean Herman, Episode: "Monsieur Lecoq") - le duc Sairmeuse
1976 : Domino (by Marcel Achard) (with Jean Piat)
1976: Au théâtre ce soir (La Frousse) (by Julien Vartet, director René Clermont, Pierre Sabbagh, théâtre Édouard VII)
1977: Dossier Danger Immédiat (by Claude Barma, Episode: "L'Affaire Martine Desclos")
1977: Dernier Appel (by Abder Isker)
1977: Attention chien méchant (by Bernard-Roland)
1978: Au théâtre ce soir (Episode: "Miam-miam ou le Dîner d'affaires", by Jacques Deval, director Jean Le Poulain, Pierre Sabbagh, théâtre Marigny)
1978: Les Amours sous la Révolution (Episode: "Les Amants de Thermidor", by Jean-Paul Carrère)
1979: La Belle Vie (by Jean Anouilh, directed by Lazare Iglesis) - le commissaire du peuple
1979: Messieurs les jurés (Episode: "L'Affaire Coublanc", by Dominique Giuliani) - le Président
1980: Les Cinq Dernières Minutes (Jean-Yves Jeudy, Episode: "Un parfum d'Angélique")
1986: Léon Blum à l'échelle humaine (Pierre Bourgeade and Jacques Rutman) - Léon Blum
1987: Les Enquêtes du commissaire Maigret (Episode: "Maigret chez le ministre", by Louis Grospierre) - Mascoulin
1989: Le Grand Secret (by Jacques Trébouta)
1991: Marie Curie, une femme honorable (by Michel Boisrond)
2010: L'Appel du 18 juin (by Félix Olivier) - maréchal Pétain
2010: Les Châtaigniers du désert (by Caroline Huppert) - le marquis (final appearance)

Notes and references

External links 
 
 Alain Mottet at Les Gens du cinéma
 Alain Mottet at Encyclo-ciné
 Alain Mottet at BDFF

1928 births
Male actors from Lyon
French male actors
2017 deaths